Haseley is a small village and former civil parish in Warwickshire, England. It is four miles north-west of the county town of Warwick and nine miles (14.5 km) south-east of Solihull, now in the parish of Beausale, Haseley, Honiley and Wroxall, created on 1 April 2007. The village is on the A4177 and is easily accessible as it is only five miles (8 km) from the M40 motorway. Haseley proper, along with Haseley Knob, Haseley Green and Waste Green, consists mainly of detached houses spread over a large area, giving the parish a very low housing density. There were, according to the 2001 census, 207 residents living in 92 dwellings. It is an affluent area, with an average house price of around £277,000 (about $367,325). Due to this and its proximity to the tourist towns of Warwick and Stratford upon Avon there are several large and highly rated hotels around the village. 

Haseley Manor, a Grade II-listed country house, which was formerly the staff college for the British Motor Corporation and its nationalised successor British Leyland, is now converted for use as private residences. The parish church, St Mary's, is medieval in origin, and revealed evidence of its original decoration during restoration work some years ago. Haseley's fifteen minutes of fame came in 1588. At the time a non-conformist publication was enraging the bishops of the Church of England and was the talk of England. To avoid detection the printing press had to move around periodically and it came to the village that year, as one of the writers was the nephew of the lord of the manor. However it was discovered there and the head of the movement, John Penry, was later hanged.

References

External links

Villages in Warwickshire
Former civil parishes in Warwickshire
Warwick District